Na or Ra is a relatively uncommon Korean family name. The name is written as 나 (Na) in South Korea, and as 라 (Ra) in North Korea. As of 2015, an estimated 160,946 people (0.32% of the population of South Korea) had the surname Na or Ra.

Origin
The name Na or Ra comes from the Chinese surname Luo, written as 羅. In Cantonese the surname is typically romanized as Lo or Law. Other possible romanizations include Nah, La, Lah, Rha, Rah, and Law.

The variant hanja 那 derives from the Chinese toponymic name Na, referring to a small state during the Zhou dynasty.

Clans

Naju Na clan

The Naju Na clan was founded by Na Bu, a Chinese native who travelled to Korea during the Goryeo period. The clan's bon-gwan is in Naju, South Jeolla Province, where Na Bu settled after coming to Korea. According to research as of 2000, there were 108,139 members of the Naju Nu clan. Notable members include Na Kyung-won, Na Moon-hee, Ra Jong-yil, Rha Woong-bae, Na Woon-gyu, and Na Hyeseok.

Notable people
Notable people with the surname Na or Ra include:
 Na Yoon-sun, South Korean jazz musician
 Na Huideok, South Korean poet
 Na Hyeseok, early Korean poet, painter, and feminist
 Na Dohyang, 20th-century Korean writer
 Na Woon-gyu, early Korean cinematographer
 Na Kyung-won, South Korean judge and politician
 Na Moon-hee, South Korean actress
 Ra Jong-yil, former South Korean ambassador
 Rha Woong-bae, South Korean politician and businessman
 Na Huna, South Korean trot singer
 Na Gwanghyeon, South Korean footballer
 Na Jiwan, South Korean outfielder
 Na Byeongyul, South Korean football midfielder
 Na Hong-jin, South Korean film director, producer, and screenwriter
 Na Seongbeom, South Korean outfielder
 Na Yeonghui, South Korean actress
 Na A-reum, South Korean racing cyclist
 Na Ry, Miss Korea 2008
 Na Seokju, Korean nationalist
 Na Tae-ju, South Korean actor, singer, and taekwondo practitioner
 Na Yeong-seok, South Korean television director and producer
 Na Hae-ryeong, South Korean singer and actress
 Na Hyeon-jeong, South Korean volleyball player
 Na Hyeon-hui, South Korean actress and singer
 Na Hyeon, South Korean screenwriter, director, script editor, and actor
 Na Dae-yong, Korean naval officer during the Imjin War
 Na Jeongung, South Korean tennis player
 Na Hye-mi, South Korean actress and model
 Na In-woo, South Korean actor
 Na Jae-min, South Korean rapper and actor

References

Na